Oltre is the solo debut EP by Italian singer Emma Marrone released by Universal Music on March 16, 2010. The album topped the charts in Italy, and was the  second-best-selling album in Italy in 2010. It was subsequently certified double platinum. The lead single on the album, "Calore", was also certified platinum. The album ranked number 85 on the Swiss charts.

The EP was named and designed after a tattoo that Emma has on the back of her neck. The same design is visible on the disc and in the digital booklet.

Track listing

Charts

Ahi ce sta passu Tour 

Beginning June 25, 2010, Marrone embarked on the Ahi ce sta passu Tour, stopping in the following cities.

Date 
 June 25: Cremona (CR) - Arena Giardino
  July 10: Viareggio (LU) - Cittadella del Carnevale
  July 18: Villafranca di Verona (VR) - Castello Scaligero
  July 20: Alessandria (AL) - La cittadella
  July 24: Udine (UD) - Castello
  July 28: Giffoni Valle Piana (SA) - Arena Alberto Sordi - La cittadella del Cinema dei Giffoni Film Festival
  July 30: Piazzola sul Brenta (PD) - Anfiteatro Camerini
 August 9: Grosseto (GR) - Parco di Pietra
  August 10: Cattolica (RN) - Arena della Regina
  August 15: Bagnara Calabra (RC) - Piazza Municipio
  August 17: Lecce (LE) - Piazza Libertini
  August 21: Pescara (PE) - Teatro d'Annunzio
  August 27: Ostuni (BR) - Piazza Libertà
 September 6: Viterbo (VT) - Arena Valle Faul
 September 10: Milano (MI) - Palasharp
 September 18: Roma (RM)  - Atlantico (ex Palacisalfa)

Set list 
"Davvero"
"Quello che" (cover 99 Posse)
"Sembra strano"
"E la luna bussò" (cover Loredana Bertè)
"Oro Nero" (cover Otto Ohm)
"Meravigliosa"
"Ma che freddo fà" (cover Nada)
"Folle Paradiso"
"Valerie" (cover Amy Winehouse)
"America" (cover Gianna Nannini)
"If I Ain't Got You" (cover Alicia Keys)
"L'esigenza di te"
"E penso a te" (cover Lucio Battisti)
"Grande grande grande" (cover Mina)
"Un sogno a costo zero"
"Walk on the Wild Side" (cover Lou Reed)
"Personal Jesus" (cover Depeche Mode)
"Calore"

Personnel 
 Flavio Pasquetto – Electric guitars and acoustic guitars
 Simone De Filippis – Electric guitars and acoustic guitars
 Luca Cirillo – Keyboard
 Daniele Formica –  Drums
 Pietro Casadei – Electric bass

References

2010 debut EPs
Emma Marrone albums